KwaNdebele was a bantustan in South Africa, intended by the apartheid government as a semi-independent homeland for the Ndebele people. The homeland was created when the South African government purchased nineteen white-owned farms and installed a government.

History
The homeland was granted self-rule in April 1981. Siyabuswa was designated as its capital, but in 1986 the capital was relocated to KwaMhlanga. The KwaNdebele legislature expressed interest in seeking independence (as in the cases of Transkei, Bophuthatswana, Venda and Ciskei) in May 1982 and some preparations were made, but an exceptional lack of viability in economic affairs along with land disputes prevented this from occurring.

KwaNdebele was re-integrated into South Africa after the first democratic election of 27 April 1994. It now forms part of the Mpumalanga province.

Districts in 1991
Districts of the province and population at the 1991 census. 
 Mdutjana: 125,485
 Mkobola: 212,771
 Mbibana: 65,989

See also
Chief Ministers of KwaNdebele

Bibliography 
  South Africa 1980/81 – Official Yearbook of the Republic of South Africa ,

References

 
1994 disestablishments in South Africa
Bantustans in South Africa
States and territories established in 1981
1981 establishments in South Africa
States and territories disestablished in 1994